is a private junior college in Kushiro, Hokkaido, Japan. It was established in 1964 as the Kushiro Women's Junior College and became the Kushio Junior College in 1973. For years it was the only private higher education institute in eastern Hokkaido.

References

External links
 Official website 

Educational institutions established in 1964
Private universities and colleges in Japan
Universities and colleges in Hokkaido
Japanese junior colleges
1964 establishments in Japan